Midón is a surname of Spanish origin. Notable people with the surname include:

 Hugo Midón (1944–2011), Argentinian author of children's books, theater director and actor
 Raul Midón (born 1966), American singer-songwriter and guitarist from New Mexico

Surnames of Spanish origin